The Trofeo Banca Popolare di Vicenza (also known as Trofeo PIVA) is a professional cycling race held annually in the Province of Vicenza, Italy. It has been part of the UCI Europe Tour since 2005 in category 1.2U, meaning it is reserved for U23 riders.

Winners

References

Cycle races in Italy
UCI Europe Tour races
Province of Vicenza